Pinta was a series of racing yachts owned by German industrialist and yachtsman Willi Illbruck. Pinta raced for DYC (Der Düsseldorfer Yachtclub) and KYC (Kieler Yacht-Club).
Willi Illbruck started sailing his first Pinta, a one-ton yacht, in 1969.
Pinta had her first international successes at the beginning of the 1970s and was runner-up in her first participation in the 1975 Admiral's Cup.

Between 1982 and 1983, Willi Illbruck and Udo Schütz built 7/8-rigged boats using the new honeycomb technique. Germany won the 1983 Admiral's Cup with Willi Illbruck's Pinta and Udo Schütz's Container.

Introducing the slogan “The Fight Goes On!” in 1993, the year turned out to be “Year of the Cups,” the most successful year in Pinta’s history. With a 100% professional crew, Pinta won the Admiral's Cup and the 1993 One Ton Cup with Russell Coutts as skipper/tactician. Pinta defended the One Ton Cup again in 1994, now with John Kostecki as skipper/tactician and Rod Davis as helmsman.

John Kostecki continued as skipper/tactician on the team from 1994.

From 1998, Willi Illbruck’s son, Michael Illbruck, continued his father’s sporting commitment with yachts named Illbruck Challenge, Nela and Pinta. The Volvo Ocean 60 yacht Illbruck Challenge won the 2001–02 Volvo Ocean Race

Picture gallery

1993, Year of the Cups
In 1993 Willi Illbruck gathered a new crew for the 1992 build Judel/Vrolijk designed One-Tonner, including Russell Coutts as skipper/tactician, Peter Lester as helmsman, Don Cowie, Ross 'Roscow' Halcrow, Alan Smith, Niels Henrik Sodemann, Uwe Roch, Gunnar Knierim, Thomas 'Beppo' Michaelsen and Arne Wilcken.

1993 turned out to become the most successful year in Pinta’s history, the “Year of the Cups”. The Pinta crew started 1993 by winning the One Ton Cup in Cagliari, Sardinia sailing for Royal New Zealand Yacht Squadron, New Zealand.

The Pinta team sailed for Germany in Admiral's Cup, with German Jörg Diesch replacing Peter Lester as helmsman.

In 1993 after twenty-three years IOR (International Offshore Rule) was the primary rule for racing around the world. As a swan song, the 1993 Champagne Mumm Admiral's Cup was keen, tight and incident-filled. The German team of Pinta, Rubin XII (Hans-Otto Schumann) and Container (Udo Schütz) were outsiders before the start, but clinched victory with 279.13 points seven races later by the narrowest ever margin, 0.25 points. The victory was even slimmer than that of the French in 1991.

It was a fine reward for the Germans, winners of the series in 1973, 1983 and 1985, especially as Willi Illbruck, owner of Pinta, and Hans-Otto Schumann, on his twelfth Rubin, had supported the event for three decades. Schumann was part of the 1973 and 1985 winning teams, having started his run of twelve Admiral's Cups as far back as 1963. Willi Illbruck was a member of the 1983 line-up.

In 1994 the Pinta crew was awarded with the Silberne Lorbeerblatt, the highest sports award in Germany.

Regatta history

References

External links
 Pinta Racing website: Sailing History Retrieved May 3, 2012
 Rc Scale Pinta Sailing Part 1

Individual sailing yachts
Recipients of the Silver Laurel Leaf